The 1987 New Zealand rugby union tour of Japan was a series of five matches played by the New Zealand national rugby union team (the All Blacks) in Japan in October and November 1987. The All Blacks won all five matches; two of them were test matches against the Japan national rugby union team.

Results 
Scores and results list All Black's points tally first.

References

  New Zealand in Japan 1987 from New Zealand Rugby Museum

New Zealand national rugby union team tours
New Zealand
Rugby union tour
Tour
Rugby union tours of Japan